Juan Antonio Diaz de Salcedo, O.F.M. (died 1603) was a Roman Catholic prelate who served as Bishop of Nicaragua (1597–1603)
and Bishop of Santiago de Cuba (1580–1597).

Biography
Juan Antonio Diaz de Salcedo was born in Burgos, Spain and ordained a priest in the Order of Friars Minor.
On 14 March 1580, he was appointed during the papacy of Pope Gregory XIII as Bishop of Santiago de Cuba. On 28 July 1597, he was appointed during the papacy of Pope Clement VIII as Bishop of Nicaragua. He served as Bishop of Nicaragua until his death in 1603.

References

External links and additional sources
 (for Chronology of Bishops)  
 (for Chronology of Bishops) 
 (for Chronology of Bishops) 
 (for Chronology of Bishops) 

16th-century Roman Catholic bishops in Nicaragua
16th-century Roman Catholic bishops in Cuba
Bishops appointed by Pope Gregory XIII
Bishops appointed by Pope Clement VIII
1603 deaths
People from Burgos
Franciscan bishops
17th-century Roman Catholic bishops in Nicaragua
Roman Catholic bishops of León in Nicaragua
Roman Catholic bishops of Santiago de Cuba